Dyrebeskyttelsen Norge ("The Norwegian Society for Protection of Animals") is a charity in Norway that promotes animal welfare.

It was established as Foreningen til Dyrenes Beskyttelse ("Association for Animal Protection") on 17 October in 1859. In 1985 it incorporated Foreningen Dyrenes Beskytter ("Association Animal protector") (founded 1893) and changed its name to Dyrenes Beskyttelse ("Animal Protection"). in 1992 it incorporated Norges Dyrevernforbund ("Norway's Animal Welfare Association") and changed its name to Dyrebeskyttelsen Norge ("Animal Protection Norway"). Chair of the board is Anne-Lise Skoie Risøen, and the organizational headquarters are in Gamle Oslo.

References

External links
Official site

Animal welfare organisations based in Norway
Animal charities
Organizations established in 1859
Organisations based in Oslo
1859 establishments in Norway